Translink is the public transit agency for Queensland, and is part of the Department of Transport and Main Roads. Translink was first introduced by the Queensland Government in June 2003 to orchestrate bus, ferry, rail and light rail services. They works with Brisbane Airtrain, Transport for Brisbane, RiverCity Ferries, Queensland Rail and other operators to provide services. Translink operates an integrated ticketing system across Queensland and the go card system to allow the use of one ticket on multiple services in South-East Queensland.

In July 2008, Translink devolved from being a division of the former Queensland Transport to the more autonomous TransLink Transit Authority, before returning to management under the Department of Transport and Main Roads in November 2012. Combining the former authority and qconnect, Translink will be responsible for providing public transport services across majority of Queensland from 16 January 2023. Buses in North Stradbroke Island are not part of the Translink network. It is operated by Transit Systems and fares are decided by Transit Systems

History
TransInfo was a phone inquiry and timetable service established in August 1993 by Queensland Transport. It was found to be a very successful service, and in a 1997 research study 99% of surveyed transport users were either very or fairly satisfied with the service. After the success of TransInfo, in June 2003 the Queensland Government introduced TransLink as an agency within Queensland Transport, replacing the former TransInfo service. With a $21.4 million budget, TransLink was tasked to introduce common fares, zones and ticket types irrespective of transit mode, and from mid-2004 a smartcard system. Prior to TransLink's introduction, combined patronage for public transport services was only around 112 million trips per year.

TransLink delivered the new integrated ticketing system in July 2004. To help facilitate the change-over, TransLink employed and deployed throughout South East Queensland 100 assistants. A daily ticket was introduced which allowed unlimited travel on all modes of public transport within the zones specified on the ticket, and for the first time students and aged pensioners throughout South East Queensland received a 50% discount on fares. In just two months an extra 2.3 million passengers travelled on transit services, and ticket sales increased by 11%. Following TransLink's introduction, transit passenger numbers grew faster than ever before. In 2005, TransLink saw close to a 20% increase in passenger numbers.

In February 2008, the go card was rolled out on bus, rail and ferry services in Brisbane only, as a precursor to its introduction throughout South East Queensland. The Queensland Government devolved TransLink from being a division of Queensland Transport to the more autonomous TransLink Transit Authority in July 2008, increasing its profile with new branding. At the same time a 24-hours-a-day, seven-days-a-week customer information and support phone number was introduced.

In November 2009, TransLink introduced cashless tickets during peak times, only accepting only go cards and pre-purchased paper tickets in an effort to improve service efficiency. In late 2009, TransLink scrapped monthly and weekly paper tickets, with plans to eliminate paper tickets by the end of 2010. On 4 January 2010, to encourage the use of the go card, off-peak discounts and a direct debit top-up option were introduced. At the same time, TransLink increased fares and also announced fares would increase by a further 45% over the following three years.

Ticketing

Translink uses zones to determine fares no matter which transit mode or route a passenger uses. In South East Queensland the zones are rings centred on the Brisbane CBD. The South East Queensland zone network stretches from Gympie (170 km north of Brisbane) to Coolangatta (100 km south of Brisbane), and from Helidon (80 km west of Brisbane) in the west to Moreton Bayside suburbs of Brisbane and Redland in the east.

Originally there were 23 zones. On 19 December 2016, the number of zones was reduced to eight. At the same time, a new fare structure was introduced that included:
 Cheaper fares across all zones
 Off-peak discounts extended to 6am (from 3am)
 Free travel for seniors after 2 journeys each day and Concession Pensioner Card holders
 Free weekend travel on a child go card
 Half-price journeys after 8 in a week
Each regional location has individual transport zones they use different fare prices to South East Queensland. One-zone fares are $2.40 for  adults and $1.20 for concession with zonal increases set at $0.60 for adults and $0.30 for concession.

Zones 
Currently each transport area has zones individual to the location. Below is the amount of zones there are per location across Queensland:

go card

Translink offers a contactless fare payment card called go card. It requires passengers to touch the card on a card reader at the start and end of each journey, and when transferring between services. The fare is automatically calculated based on the difference between the highest zone number and the lowest zone number recorded for the journey. A journey can comprise any number of individual legs (each recorded by touching the card when entering or leaving a service) within a two-hour period. The fare is automatically deducted from a pre-paid balance associated with the go card used.

The following types of go card are available:
Adult go card is for use by passengers without concessions. Tertiary students, job seekers and asylum seekers will need to have an adult go card in order to have concession fares activated on the card. 
Child go card is for use by children under the age of 15 years.
Concession go card is for use by passengers entitled to a concession, such as secondary students, holders of a Pensioner Concession Card, and holders of a Repatriation Health Card.
Seniors go card is for use by passengers who have a Queensland Seniors Card issued by the Queensland Government.
Seniors+go card incorporates a Queensland Seniors Card and a go card on both sides.

go seeQ card
The go seeQ card was introduced in late 2012 for visitors to South East Queensland. This card provides for travel for a period of 3 or 5 days across the Translink network. The card can also be used to receive discounts at retail locations throughout the South East Queensland region.

Paper tickets
A single-fare paper ticket is also available for infrequent travellers and visitors.
Single – one-way travel with unlimited transfers for two hours for travel through up to 10 zones and three-and-a- half hours for more than 10 zones.
Single (Concession) – for eligible students, pensioners and children, who travel for half the price of an equivalent regular adult fare. Children under five years of age travel free. A valid concession card must be presented when purchasing and presenting a concession ticket.

Authorised Officers
Translink employ a team of authorised officers called Senior Network Officers. Senior Network Officers were introduced in 2010 and they utilise powers available under section 111(3) of the Transport Operations (Passenger Transport) Act 1994 and Transport Infrastructure Act 1994.

As authorised officers, they enforce Translink's conditions of travel for passengers on the network. Senior Network Officers issue infringement notices for transport offences.

Senior Network Officers also carry handcuffs and can exercise a power to detain for certain offences committed on public transport

Translink South East Queensland network

The Translink SEQ network is divided into seven regions, each region operated by a different operators. The regions are based largely on local government boundaries:

Greater Brisbane
Airtrain Services Operator - Airtrain Citylink
Bus Services Operator - Brisbane Bus Lines 
Bus Services Operator - Transport for Brisbane
Ferry Services Operator - RiverCity Ferries
Train Services Operator - Queensland Rail

Northern
Bus Services Operator - Caboolture Bus Lines
Bus Services Operator - Hornibrook Bus Lines
Bus Services Operator - Kangaroo Bus Lines
Bus Services Operator - Thompsons Bus Service

Southern
Bus Services Operator - Park Ridge Transit
Bus Services Operator - Clarks Logan City Bus Service
Bus Services Operator - Kinetic

Eastern
Bus Services Operator - Mt Gravatt Bus Service
Bus Services Operator - Transdev Queensland

Western
Bus Services Operator - Westside Bus Company
Bus Services Operator - Bus Queensland Lockyer Valley
Bus Services Operator - Southern Cross Transit

Sunshine Coast
Bus Services Operator - CDC Queensland
Bus Services Operator - Kinetic

Gold Coast

Tram Services Operator - G:link
Bus Services Operator - Kinetic

Translink regional network

The Translink Regional network is divided into 12 regions (16 regions from 16 January 2023), each region operated by a different operators. The regions are based largely on local government boundaries:

Bowen 

 Bus Services Operator - Trans North Bus & Coach

Bundaberg 
 Bus Services Operator - Kinetic
 Bus Services Operator - Stewart & Sons

Cairns 
Bus Services Operator - Kinetic

Fraser Coast 

 Bus Services Operator - Wide Bay Transit

Gladstone 

 Bus Services Operator - CDC Queensland

Gympie 

 Bus Services Operator - Polleys Coaches

Innisfail 

 Bus Services Operator - Trans North Bus & Coach

Kilcoy 
 Bus Services Operator - GJ & LE Christensen Bus & Coach

Mackay 
Bus Services Operator - Mackay Transit Coaches

Rockhampton and Yeppoon 

 Bus Services Operator - Young's Bus Service
 Bus Services Operator - Kinetic

Sunshine Coast Hinterland 

 Bus Services Operator - Glasshouse Country Coaches

Toowoomba 
Bus Services Operator - Bus Queensland

Townsville and Magnetic Island
Bus Services Operator - Kinetic

Warwick 

 Bus Services Operator - Haidley's Panoramic Coaches

Whitsundays 

 Bus Services Operator - Whitsunday Transit

Non-Translink regional bus

North Stradbroke Island 
 Bus Services Operator - Transit Systems

Services
Translink operates various types of services under different names. Below are a few services they operate.

CityGlider

CityGlider is a brand name applied to a pair of high-frequency bus routes operated by Transport for Brisbane in Brisbane, Australia. Both are operated by dedicated fleets of buses vinyled in either blue or maroon liveries with a gliding possum motif. Bus stops serviced by the CityGlider services are identified with signs and painted kerb. Both operate 24 hours a day on Fridays and Saturdays.

The CityGlider service is pre-paid only, meaning passengers are required to use a go card to touch on/off when boarding and exiting the service. To assist with keeping the service running on-time, both front and rear boarding is possible - the CityGlider is the only service which allows this.

Bus upgrade zone

Bus upgrade zones, commonly abbreviated to BUZ, are a feature of Brisbane's public transport system. The name is given to high-frequency bus routes operated by Transport for Brisbane, the Brisbane City Council agency that operates the city's public bus services for Translink. All BUZ services run at least every fifteen minutes from around 6:00am to 11:30pm seven days a week and at least every ten minutes during peak hours from Monday to Friday.

Nearly all BUZ routes are express services which provide quick and frequent access to places along major trunk roads, with the exception of routes 196 and 199, which are the only all-stops BUZ service with bus stops within short walking distances of each other between the inner suburbs of Fairfield, West End, New Farm and Teneriffe. Most BUZ routes are radial, and commence in or near the Brisbane CBD. However, routes 196 and 199 are again an exception, in that they are cross-town routes that passes through the CBD.

NightLink

NightLink is the name given to the all-night Translink services that leave Fortitude Valley, Brisbane City and Surfers Paradise on the Gold Coast late Friday and Saturday nights.

Brisbane City Bus Loops

Great Circle Line 
The Great Circle Line is a loop operated by Transport for Brisbane serving various shopping centres and other attractions around Brisbane.

Spring Hill Loop 
The Spring Hill Loop is a free loop service operated by Transport for Brisbane servicing stops popular locations such as Post Office Square, Old Windmill Observatory, St Andrew’s War Memorial Hospital, Brisbane Private Hospital and Central Station.

City Loop 
The City Loop is a free loop service operated by Transport for Brisbane servicing stops popular locations such as QUT, Alice Street, Botanic Gardens, Queen Street Mall, City Hall, Central Station, Riverside and Eagle Street Pier.

South Brisbane Loop 
The South Brisbane Loop is a free loop service operated by Transport for Brisbane servicing stops popular locations such as Cineplex at South Brisbane, Gallery of Modern Art, South Brisbane Station / Cultural Centre, Davies Park and South Bank Busway.

Infrastructure

References

External links

 
Public transport in Queensland
Intermodal transport authorities in Australia
Bus transport in Queensland
Ferry transport in Queensland
Rail transport in Queensland
Public transport in Brisbane
2003 establishments in Australia